North Hinksey is a village and civil parish in Oxfordshire, England, immediately west of Oxford.  The civil parish includes the large settlement of Botley, effectively a suburb of Oxford. North Hinksey was part of Berkshire until the 1974 boundary changes transferred it to Oxfordshire.  The village of North Hinksey has a manor house, The Fishes public house, a Church of England primary school and a Church of England parish church, St. Lawrence's, which dates back to at least the 12th century.  Four of the older houses have thatched roofs.  

There was also the administrative offices of the Church of England Diocese of Oxford (Diocesan Church House) in the enlarged former vicarage. This, as of September 2016 is to be converted to housing. Harcourt Hill and Raleigh Park lie to the southwest of the village.  All the shopping and other facilities in the parish are now found in Botley. The centre of the old village is now effectively cut off from much of the newer part of Botley by the busy Oxford Ring Road, part of the A34 trunk road, though there are two pedestrian underpasses.  The parish has a cemetery which includes 671 identified Commonwealth war graves.

History
Also called Hengestesige (10th century); Hengsteseia (12th century); Henxtesey (13th century); Northengseye (15th century); Laurence Hinksey, Ferry Hinksey, Ivy Hinksey, (passim).
North Hinksey was anciently called Hengestseigge, and was given in 955 to Abingdon Abbey. This place was settled in the Saxon era. Its toponym is thought to mean 'stallion's isle'. Along with the neighbouring village of South Hinksey, it was once part of the estate of the Benedictine abbey at Abingdon, and was in Berkshire until the boundary changes of 1974.  The village appears on the 1610 John Speed map as 'Laurence Hinksey', after the church's dedication, while a 1670s map shows 'Ivy Hinksey'.  

It was also at one time called Ferry Hinksey, being linked to the eastern side of Hinksey Stream by a small ferry, reached from west Oxford by way of Ferry Hinksey Road.  The ferry ceased operation in 1928, and the various streams are now crossed by small bridges, though a 'Ferry Cottage' remains that matches the period and has access to the river. Ferry Hinksey (as it was then) is also the burial place of Thomas and Rachael Willis (died 1648 and 1631 respectively) the parents of the physician Dr Thomas Willis. He played an important part in the history of anatomy, neurology, and psychiatry, and was a founding member of the Royal Society.

The parish church of Saint Lawrence's contains two war memorials commemorating the twenty-three men of North Hinksey and Botley who died in the two world wars.

John Ruskin and the diggers
The critic John Ruskin was fond of riding out from Oxford, and his trips often took him westwards to North Hinksey, whose rustic charm he admired.  (There is a plaque to this effect on one of the old thatched cottages.)  He noted the poor state of the village road, and in 1874, he thought of a scheme which would give Oxford students the benefits of manual labour, and also improve conditions for the villagers.  He organised a group of undergraduates to help him in the building of an improved road, bordered with banks of flowers.  The episode might have vanished into historical obscurity, except that the students in his road-building gang included Oscar Wilde, Alfred Milner, Hardwicke Rawnsley, William Gershom Collingwood and Arnold Toynbee.  Wilde later wrote of the episode in Art and the Handicraftsman, (published in Essays, 1879):

Local topography 
It remains difficult to travel from North Hinksey to South Hinksey, although the Oxford Ring Road now links the two villages.  The most notable path between Oxford and North Hinksey is a metalled bridleway and cycle track variously known as Willow Walk and Ruskin's Ride.  This path was built in 1876–77 by Aubrey Harcourt (1852–1904), a major local landowner, but not open to the public until 1922.  There is also a smaller unmade path which begins alongside the large back garden of The Fishes and crosses Hinksey Stream by a bridge at the site of the old ferry.

Raleigh Park

Raleigh Park, comprising woodland, grassland and unusual alkaline boggy areas, lies in North Hinksey just west of the Oxford ring road. It is managed by Oxford City Council and conservation work is done by the Friends of Raleigh Park and the Oxford Conservation Volunteers.

See also
Hinksey
Hinksey Stream
New Hinksey
South Hinksey
Botley, Oxfordshire

References

Further reading

External links

North Hinksey, St Lawrence's Church
North Hinksey Catholic Parish
Botley Cemetery (Commonwealth War Graves Commission)

Areas of Oxford
Villages in Oxfordshire
Civil parishes in Oxfordshire